Sangan District is a district (bakhsh) in Khaf County, Razavi Khorasan province, Iran. At the 2006 census, its population was 19,726, in 4,291 families.  The district has one city: Sangan. The district has two rural districts (dehestan): Bostan Rural District and Pain Khaf Rural District.

References 

Districts of Razavi Khorasan Province
Khaf County